Renie Cox (born September 15, 1938) is a retired American alpine ski racer and a former member of the United States Ski Team. She competed in the slalom at the 1960 Winter Olympics and finished ninth.

Born in Lowville, New York, Cox was raised in the Lake Placid area and attended the University of Denver in Colorado. She married fellow ski team member Dave Gorsuch and they resided in Colorado.

Olympic results

References

External links
 

1938 births
Living people
American female alpine skiers
Olympic alpine skiers of the United States
Alpine skiers at the 1960 Winter Olympics
People from Lowville, New York
21st-century American women